Slalom is a 1965 Italian comedy film directed by Luciano Salce and starring Vittorio Gassman.

Plot
Lucio and Riccardo, a pair of married pals, take their wives on a ski vacation in Sestriere but get distracted by the beautiful and seductive Nadia and Helen, who lure them into unexpected adventure and danger where Lucio is forced to go to Egypt with another passport and identity.

Cast
 Vittorio Gassman as Lucio Ridolfi
 Adolfo Celi as Riccardo
 Daniela Bianchi as Nadia
 Beba Lončar as Helen
 Lobna Abdel Aziz as Fahra, Egyptian flight attendant (as Loubna A.Aziz)
 Emma Danieli as Hilde, Lucio's wife
 Corrado Olmi as Italian Consulat Official
 Bob Oliver as George
 Nagwa Fouad as Nabila
 Isabella Biagini as Simonetta, Riccardo's wife
 Piero Vida as The Murderer

References

External links

1965 films
1965 comedy films
1960s Italian-language films
Films directed by Luciano Salce
Commedia all'italiana
Films scored by Ennio Morricone
1960s Italian films